Ibrahimpatnam Assembly constituency is a constituency of Telangana Legislative Assembly, India. It is one of 14 constituencies in Ranga Reddy district. It is part of Bhuvanagiri Lok Sabha constituency.

M. Kishan Reddy is currently representing the constituency.

Mandals
The Assembly Constituency presently comprises the following Mandals:

Members of the Legislative Assembly

Election results

2018

2014

See also
 Ibrahimpatnam
 List of constituencies of Telangana Legislative Assembly

References

Assembly constituencies of Telangana
Ranga Reddy district